Coleophora suaedicola is a moth of the family Coleophoridae. It is found in 
the United States, including Indiana.

The larvae feed on the leaves of Suaeda species. They create a trivalved, tubular silken case.

References

suaedicola
Moths of North America
Moths described in 1898